Zirin is a surname. Notable people with the surname include:

 Dave Zirin, American sportswriter
 Harold Zirin (born 1929), American solar astronomer
 James D. Zirin (born 1940), American lawyer, writer, and talk show host
Amelia Zirin-Brown, singer and actress better known as Lady Rizo

See also
 Zir'in, Palestinian village